The Golden Lights Championship was a golf tournament on the LPGA Tour from 1975 to 1981. It was played at the All-American Sports City Country club in Pine Plains, New York in 1975, at the Wykagyl Country Club in New Rochelle, New York from 1976 to 1980 and at The Stanwich Club in Greenwich, Connecticut in 1981.

Winners
Golden Lights Championship
1981 Cathy Reynolds
1980 Beth Daniel
1979 Nancy Lopez
1978 Nancy Lopez

Talk Tournament '77
1977 JoAnne Carner

Girl Talk Classic
1976 Pat Bradley
1975 JoAnne Carner

References

Former LPGA Tour events
Golf in New York (state)
Golf in Connecticut
Sports in New Rochelle, New York
Recurring sporting events established in 1975
Recurring sporting events disestablished in 1981
1975 establishments in New York (state)
1981 disestablishments in Connecticut
Sports competitions in Connecticut